Taypi Qullu (Aymara taypi center, middle, qullu mountain, "center mountain", Hispanicized spelling Taypi Khollu) is a mountain in the Bolivian Andes, about  high. It is situated in the La Paz Department, Murillo Province, La Paz Municipality. Taypi Qullu lies south-east of the mountain Llamp'u.

References 

Mountains of La Paz Department (Bolivia)